PIN4 or PIN-4 may refer to:
PIN4, the gene encoding the protein Peptidyl-prolyl cis-trans isomerase NIMA-interacting 4 (PIN4)
PIN-4, a cocktail for immunohistochemistry, targeting TP63, CK-5, CK-14 and P504S